Kris Edward Roberts is a Democratic member of the New Hampshire House of Representatives, representing the Cheshire 3rd District since 2004.

External links
New Hampshire House of Representatives - Kris Roberts official NH House website
Project Vote Smart - Representative Kris Roberts (NH) profile
AllBallots.com - Rep Kris Robert profile
Follow the Money - Kris Roberts
2006 2004 campaign contributions

Members of the New Hampshire House of Representatives
1954 births
Living people
21st-century American politicians
People from Evanston, Wyoming